Mark R. Abbott was the director and president of the Woods Hole Oceanographic Institution (WHOI) from 2015 to 2020.  Prior to joining WHOI, he was a dean at Oregon State University, and conducted research with the Jet Propulsion Laboratory, Office of Naval Research, and the Scripps Institution of Oceanography. His oceanographic researches focuses primarily on upper ocean biological and physical processes.

References

Living people
Year of birth missing (living people)
American oceanographers
University of California, Berkeley alumni
University of California, Davis alumni
Scripps Institution of Oceanography faculty
Oregon State University faculty
Place of birth missing (living people)